Ridgedale Junior/Senior High School is a public high school in Morral, Ohio.  It is the only high school in the Ridgedale Local School District. In 2019, the average class size was 45 students.

Academics 
In order to graduate, students must obtain 21 credits by the end of their senior year. They are required 4 credits of English, 4 credits of mathematics, 3 credits of science, 3 credits of social studies, a half-credit of health, and a half-credit of physical education.

To graduate with honors, students are required to complete all but one of the following requirements:
 4 credits of English
 4 credits of mathematics (Algebra I, Geometry, Algebra II, and a higher-level course)
 4 credits of science (including physics and chemistry)
 4 credits of social studies
 3 credits of foreign language
 1 credit of fine arts
 3.5 grade-point average on a 4.0 scale
 A score of 27 on the ACT or a 1210 on the SAT

Students also receive credit for classes taken at Tri-Rivers Career Center or Ohio colleges through the state's College Credit Plus program.

Athletics and Extracurriculars 

The team nickname is the Rockets. When Ridgedale was a member of the Mid-Ohio Athletic Conference, they had a long-standing rivalry with the Pleasant Spartans. A lot of competition held between the two schools often became heated.

Athletics
Conference:
Ridgedale High School voted to join the Northwest Central Conference publisher=Mid Ohio Athletic Conference | access-date=5 Octobuter 2022}}</ref> in 2021. Ridgedale High School previously competed as a member of the Northern 10 Athletic Conference, which was formed for the 2014–15 school year.  Ridgedale had previously competed as a charter member of the Mid-Ohio Athletic Conference (MOAC), which was established in 1990.

Ohio High School Athletic Association State Championships
 Boys Baseball – 1992

Extracurriculars
Student Council
Marching Band
Pep Band
Jazz Band
Choir
Spring Musical
Cheerleading
Yearbook Club
Fellowship of Christian Athletes
Teen Institute
LEO Club
National Honor Society
Robotics Club
Art Club
Spanish Club
FFA

Administration

Board of Education

Eric Park
Angela Burns
Andy Rickets
Ryan Cook
Ed Roush

Superintendent
Dr. Erika Bower

Treasurer
Jason Fleming

Notes and references

External links
Ridgedale Local School District website

High schools in Marion County, Ohio
Public high schools in Ohio
Public middle schools in Ohio